Baron Aviation Services is an American cargo airline based in Vichy, Missouri, United States. It was established in 1973 and operates small package express cargo services on behalf of FedEx Express. Its main base is Rolla National Airport, Vichy, Missouri.

Fleet 
The Baron Aviation Services fleet consists of the following aircraft (at December 2021)

Accidents and Incidents
November 16, 1991: A Cessna 208 Caravan leased from FedEx, departed on a cargo flight from Memphis en route to Destin when it plunged into Choctawhatchee Bay 2 miles NE of the Destin-Fort Walton Beach Airport while approaching for a landing. The pilot onboard was killed. The cause was determined to be the pilot's failure to follow proper ILS rules.
March 5, 1998: Flight 8315, a Cessna 208 Caravan leased from FedEx departed on a cargo flight from Memphis en route to Bowling Green when radar and radio contact was lost. The plane crashed about 8.8 miles SE of Clarksville on a ridge on the northern side of a valley. The pilot, who was the only occupant was killed. The cause of the crash was ice on the wings, causing the plane to stall and crash.
November 6, 2012: Flight 8560, a Cessna 208 Caravan leased from FedEx departed on a scheduled cargo flight from Wichita to Garden City when the engine failed on the initial climb. While attempting to return to Wichita Mid-Continent Airport the airplane impacted a tree in a field 1.3 miles south of Runway 1L. The pilot, the only occupant was killed. The cause of the crash was engine failure due to compressor turbine blade separation.

References

External links
Baron Aviation Services

Cargo airlines of the United States
Airlines established in 1973
Airlines based in Missouri
1973 establishments in Missouri